Kenya–United Arab Emirates relations are the bilateral relations between Kenya and the United Arab Emirates.

State visits
In 2011, President Mwai Kibaki made a state visit to the UAE and held talks with the President of the UAE and Ruler of Abu Dhabi, Khalifa bin Zayed Al Nahyan Prime Minister and Ruler of Dubai, Mohammed bin Rashid Al Maktoum he also met the Crown Prince of UAE Mohammed bin Zayed Al Nahyan.

In 2014, President Uhuru Kenyatta made a state visit to the UAE, he held talks with Prime Minister and Ruler of Dubai, Mohammed bin Rashid Al Maktoum. They held talks about counter terrorism and youth radicalisation. They also witnessed the signing of a trade agreement. The Promotion and Protection of Investments will see more FDI from the UAE and will ease Kenyan companies wanting to do business in the UAE.

The Kenyan President also met the Interior Minister and Deputy Prime Minister of UAE, His Highness Sheikh Saif Bin Zayed. He also held talks with the UAE Minister of Foreign Affairs, Sheikh Abdalla Bin Zayed.

Trade
In 2013, Kenyan imports from the UAE stood at KES. 143 billion (EUR. 1.348 billion). Made up mostly of oil and petroleum products. Kenyan exports to the UAE stood at KES. 30 billion (EUR. 286 million).

Total trade between both countries stood at KES. 173 billion (EUR. 1.634 billion). This made the UAE Kenya's 4th largest trading partner and the largest trading partner and export destination in the Middle East.

The UAE is Kenya's 5th largest export destination and the 4th largest import source.

As of 2010, approximately 36,000 Kenyans work in the UAE.

Diplomatic missions
Kenya maintains an embassy in Abu Dhabi and a consulate in Dubai.

In August 2014, the UAE announced that it would upgrade its Nairobi mission to the largest in Africa. The mission would actively participate in linking Kenyans with job opportunities in the UAE.

See also 
 Foreign relations of Kenya 
 Foreign relations of the United Arab Emirates

References

 
United Arab Emirates
Bilateral relations of the United Arab Emirates